Andrej Themár (born June 28, 1988) is a Slovak professional ice hockey left winger. He is currently a free agent having last played for TH Unia Oświęcim of the Polska Hokej Liga.

Themár previously played in the Tipsport Liga in Slovakia for MHC Martin and HC '05 Banská Bystrica. He moved to GKS Katowice of the Polska Hokej Liga on September 6, 2017 and then moved to TH Unia Oświęcim the following year.

References

External links

1988 births
Living people
Les Aigles de Nice players
HC '05 Banská Bystrica players
HC 07 Detva players
MHK Dolný Kubín players
Hull Pirates players
GKS Katowice (ice hockey) players
MHk 32 Liptovský Mikuláš players
MHC Martin players
Sportspeople from Martin, Slovakia
HC Prešov players
Slovak ice hockey forwards
TH Unia Oświęcim players
Slovak expatriate sportspeople in France
Slovak expatriate sportspeople in Norway
Slovak expatriate sportspeople in England
Slovak expatriate sportspeople in Poland
Slovak expatriate ice hockey people
Expatriate ice hockey players in Norway
Expatriate ice hockey players in Poland
Expatriate ice hockey players in England
Expatriate ice hockey players in France